Khatuna Lorig (born January 1, 1974, as Khatuna Kvrivishvili) is a Georgian archer who immigrated to the United States.

She has used at least 3 different last names while competing in and representing various different countries.
 Khatuna Kvrivichvili, Soviet Union (part of the Unified Team) at Barcelona 1992.  At the age of 18, she won the bronze medal
 Khatuna Lorigi, while competing for Georgia in the Atlanta (1996) and Sydney (2000) Olympic games.
 Khatuna Lorig, from 2004 when she was unable to participate in the Olympic Games in Athens because of citizenship issues. She competed for the United States at the 2008 Olympics. Then, at the age of 38 she competed again for Team USA at the 2012 London Olympics.

Career 
Lorig's hometown is Tbilisi, Georgia, where she started her archery training in 6th grade at a state-sponsored school. Her training involved learning how to hold a bow for eight months while looking in the mirror before being able to actually load an arrow.

Lorig earned individual bronze and team gold medals at the 1990 European Championships in Barcelona competing for the Soviet Union. She also earned individual and team gold medals at the 1992 European Championships in Malta.

When she was 18 and while four months pregnant, Lorig earned a bronze medal in women's team competing for the Unified Team at the 1992 Olympics. Lorig went on to compete for Georgia at the 1996 Olympics. After competing in the 1996 Olympics in the United States, she decided to remain in the US and settled in Brooklyn and later New Jersey. She competed again for Georgia at the 2000 Olympics as Khatuna Lorigi.

Lorig became a naturalized U.S. citizen and qualified to compete in the women's individual archery event at the 2008 Olympics in Beijing. There Lorig finished her ranking round with a total of 635 points. This gave her the 26th seed for the final competition bracket in which she faced Virginie Arnold in the first round, beating the archer from France with 107-105. In the second round she was too strong for Alison Williamson with 112-109 and via Ana Rendón (107-95) she achieved her place in the quarter final. There she was unable to beat eventual bronze medalist Yun Ok-Hee who won the match with 111-105. Lorig was afterwards chosen to be the U.S. flagbearer in the closing ceremony.

She taught actress Jennifer Lawrence how to shoot with a recurve bow for the 2012 film The Hunger Games. During that year's Olympics, Lorig finished fourth.

In April 2016, she received her first sponsorship deal with a non-archery brand, appearing in a commercial for Bridgestone tires. She was also selected to be part of "Team Bridgestone," a group of 6 Olympic and Paralympic athletes attempting to compete in the 2016 Rio Olympic Games.

References

External links
 NBC Olympics athlete bio 
 American dream is right on target for archer Lorig
 

1974 births
Living people
American female archers
Female archers from Georgia (country)
Soviet female archers
Archers at the 1992 Summer Olympics
Archers at the 1996 Summer Olympics
Archers at the 2000 Summer Olympics
Archers at the 2008 Summer Olympics
Archers at the 2011 Pan American Games
Archers at the 2012 Summer Olympics
Archers at the 2015 Pan American Games
Archers at the 2019 Pan American Games
Olympic archers of the Unified Team
Olympic archers of Georgia (country)
Olympic archers of the United States
Olympic bronze medalists for the Unified Team
American people of Georgian (country) descent
Sportspeople from Tbilisi
Olympic medalists in archery
Georgian emigrants to the United States
Pan American Games gold medalists for the United States
Pan American Games silver medalists for the United States
Pan American Games bronze medalists for the United States
World Archery Championships medalists
Medalists at the 1992 Summer Olympics
Pan American Games medalists in archery
Medalists at the 2019 Pan American Games
Medalists at the 2011 Pan American Games
Medalists at the 2015 Pan American Games
21st-century American women